Allium przewalskianum is an Asian species of wild onion in the Amaryllis family.

The species is widely distributed in mountains areas in the Himalayas (India, Nepal, Pakistan) and parts of China (Gansu, Inner Mongolia, Ningxia, Qinghai, Shaanxi, Sichuan, Xinjiang, Tibet, Yunnan).

Allium przewalskianum has narrow bulbs up to 10 mm across. Scape is up to 40 cm tall, round in cross-section. Leaves are tubular, about the same length as the scape. Umbel is densely crowded with many red or dark purple flowers.

Allium przewalskianum is one of two species referred to as jimbu in Nepal, used in Nepalese cuisine. The other is Allium hypsistum.

References

External links
 

przewalskianum
Onions
Nepalese cuisine
Flora of China
Flora of East Himalaya
Flora of Nepal
Flora of West Himalaya
Plants described in 1875